Abraham Lincoln High School is a high school located in San Jose, California, in the San Jose Unified School District. It is a magnet school for "Academic, Visual, and Performing Arts" (AVPA). The current principal is Joseph Heffernan, Ed.D.

Activities

Abraham Lincoln High School offers various extracurricular activities. Eight performing arts teachers, along with numerous volunteers, are responsible for the drama, dance and music department. Lincoln is noted for its Mock Trial team, which is one of only two California teams to have won the California State Championships twice in a row (the other is La Reina High School). Lincoln Lion Tales, a student-run newspaper, highlights recent events at the school.

Performing arts
The school has five performing arts programs: Orchestra, Band, Choir, Dance and Drama.

Orchestra
Lincoln's orchestral program consists of three ensembles: Intermezzo, string orchestra and the Lincoln High Chamber Orchestra. The orchestral program also has two spinoff groups, Lincoln's mariachi band and the Lincoln Philharmonic Orchestra.

Band
Lincoln has a variety of bands ranging from a classical wind symphony to the jazz band. Eeach of the school's musicals has a live "pit band".

Choir
The school's choir program consists of about a half dozen choir classes with levels ranging from beginning to advanced.

Dance
With a dozen classes and hundreds of performers, the dance department is Lincoln's largest performing arts program. There are three dance teams. "The Convertibles" and "Lincoln Performance Company" perform lyrical, classical and jazz pieces. There are the Xochitl Cultural and Folklorico Dance programs.

Drama
The drama department puts on four productions per year in addition to a three-day "One Act Festival" at the end of each year. The four show season features two musicals and two plays. The department consists of five theatre classes and two technical theatre groups that cover a wide range of material each year.

Athletics
The school mascot is a Lion. The school colors are blue and gold. Lincoln High School competes in the Blossom Valley Athletic League. Lincoln High offers badminton, baseball, basketball, cross country, American football, golf, soccer, softball, swimming, tennis, track and field, volleyball, water polo and wrestling.

The football teams of San Jose High School and Lincoln face off at San Jose City College each Thanksgiving in the Big Bone Game. This rivalry game has been held since 1942 and is held annually at this neutral site. Its name is from a San Jose High School student who, in 1942, found a large steer leg in his father's butcher shop and declared it the trophy for the winning school. The junior varsity football teams from the schools hold the Little Bone Game annually on the Thursday before the Big Bone Game.

The track and field is named after Don Bowden, a Lincoln High School student who went on to the Olympics and was the first American to beat the 4-minute mile.

Demographics

0.3% American Indian, 4.4% Asian, 2.4% Filipino, 3.0% African American, 16.9% White, 69.2% Latino, 0.5% Pacific Islander, two more races 2.2%

Notable alumni
Don Bowden, an Olympic runner and the first American to break the 4-minute mile.
Courtney Bryan, professional American football player
Lorna Dee Cervantes, poet
Bob Bowman (outfielder), former Major League Baseball player for Philadelphia Phillies
Megan Dirkmaat, 2004 Summer Olympics silver medalist rowing
Shamako Noble, hip-hop artist and political activist
Bud Ogden, professional basketball player
Ralph Ogden, professional basketball player
Anjelah Johnson, American actress, stand-up comedian

References

External links

Official website
San Jose Unified School District
Blossom Valley Athletic League

San José Unified School District
High schools in San Jose, California
Public high schools in California
Magnet schools in California
1942 establishments in California